Joyce MacIver (Baltimore, 1904 – New York, 1999), born Georgette Scott, was an American novelist and playwright.

Her most famous novel is The Frog Pond (1961), based on episodes of her own life. Other works include the novels The Exquisite Thing (1968), Mercy (1977) and The Glimpse (1984), and the play American Royalty with Richard Haase.

Sources
 New York Times obituary.
 Special collection at the Milton S. Eisenhower Library, The Johns Hopkins University, Baltimore.

20th-century American novelists
American women novelists
1999 deaths
1904 births
20th-century American women writers